Devindar Sunil Walmiki (born 28 May 1992) is an Indian field hockey player who plays as a midfielder.

He was named in the Indian squad for the 2016 Summer Olympics.

Walmiki's elder brother Yuvraj Walmiki has also played field hockey for India.

Club career
In July 2019 Devindar signed for Dutch club HGC in the Hoofdklasse.

References

External links

1992 births
Living people
Field hockey players from Mumbai
Indian male field hockey players
Male field hockey midfielders
Field hockey players at the 2016 Summer Olympics
Olympic field hockey players of India
Men's Hoofdklasse Hockey players
HGC players
Expatriate field hockey players